"The Looking Glass" is a song by the American progressive metal band Dream Theater, from their 2013 self-titled album. It was released as a single on February 3, 2014. Musically, the song is a tribute to Rush, one of Dream Theater's biggest influences.

The song was included in the setlist on Dream Theater's Along for the Ride Tour, and is featured on the live album Breaking the Fourth Wall.

Track listing

Releases 
 CD-R, Single, Promo – Roadrunner Records, US, February 3, 2014.

References

Dream Theater songs
2013 songs
Songs written by John Petrucci
Songs written by John Myung